Sharne Mary Mayers (born 19 July 1992) is a Zimbabwean cricketer who plays for the Zimbabwe women's national cricket team.

Mayers was named in Zimbabwe's squad for the 2008 Women's Cricket World Cup Qualifier in South Africa. She captained the Zimbabwe women's national cricket team in the 2017 Women's Cricket World Cup Qualifier in February 2017. She made her Women's Twenty20 International (WT20I) debut for Zimbabwe against Namibia women on 5 January 2019. In July 2019, she was one of four Zimbabwe women cricketers barred by the International Cricket Council (ICC) from playing in a Global Development Squad, due to play against Women's Cricket Super League teams, following the ICC's suspension of Zimbabwe Cricket earlier in the month.

In November 2021, she was named in Zimbabwe's Women's One Day International (WODI) squad for their series against Bangladesh. She made her WODI debut on 13 November 2021, for Zimbabwe against Bangladesh. Later the same month, she was named in Zimbabwe's team for the 2021 Women's Cricket World Cup Qualifier tournament in Zimbabwe.

References

External links
 
 

1992 births
Living people
Cricketers from Bulawayo
Zimbabwean women cricketers
Zimbabwe women One Day International cricketers
Zimbabwe women Twenty20 International cricketers
Central Gauteng women cricketers